Keōua Kūahuula was an Alii (member of the royal class) during the time of the unification of the Kingdom of Hawaii.

Family 
His name means "rain cloud of the red cloak".

His father was Kalaniʻōpuʻu, the king at the time of the arrival of Captain James Cook. 

His mother was Kānekapōlei, one of the later wives of Kalaniōpuu, and mother of Pauli Kaʻōleiokū, the grandfather of Bernice Pauahi Bishop and Ruth Keelikolani.

This meant his older half-brother Kīwalaʻō was in line to inherit the kingdom.

Later life
He was not happy, however, to receive no lands after his father died in 1781. He challenged his cousin Kamehameha I, resulting in the Battle of Moku'ohai. He escaped the battle to relatives in the Kaū district to the South in 1782. Although Kamehameha controlled the West side of the island, repeated raids never resulted in a clear victory for either side.

In 1790, after escaping another attack, his party was caught in an eruption of Kilauea, and lost two thirds of his army to lava.
He was killed in 1791 when Kamehameha invited him to the Puukoholā Heiau in Kohala. He was captured in what is sometimes called the Battle of Kawaihae, and Keōua's body offered to sanctify the new temple.

He may have mutilated himself before landing so as to render himself an inappropriate  sacrificial victim. As he stepped on shore, one of Kamehameha's chiefs threw a spear at him. By some accounts he dodged it, but was then cut down by musket fire. Caught by surprise, Keōua's bodyguards were killed.

Keoua had many wives including Kaʻiolaniokaʻiwalani, Hiʻileiohiiaka, Nalaniewalu and Luahiwa. He had several daughters and two sons.
He was the last independent district ruler on the island of Hawaii.

References

1791 deaths
Royalty of Hawaii (island)
House of Keawe
Hawaiian military personnel
Year of birth unknown